"Finland" is a Monty Python comedy song written and performed by Michael Palin and arranged by John Du Prez with a guitar accompaniment by Brian Willoughby. It first appeared on the album Monty Python's Contractual Obligation Album from 1980 and was later included on the 1989 compilation Monty Python Sings.

It purports to be a celebration of Finland, a country that is overlooked when travelling abroad as "a poor second to Belgium", despite the fact that it "has it all" with lofty mountains and tall trees and pleasures including: pony trekking, camping or "just watching TV". (In reality, "mountains so lofty" are not characteristic of Finland as the Scandinavian Mountains only just touch the northwesternmost corner of the country.)

Michael Palin was filmed singing a verse from "Finland" during an episode of his 1992 travelogue series Pole to Pole during a segment in which he is shown traveling across that country. A heavily edited version of "Finland" is used as the opening song of the stage musical Spamalot (ending with a historian exasperatedly yelling "I said England!"), and it appeared in a new version as part of the "Spam Song" in Monty Python Live (Mostly).

References 

Monty Python songs
Songs about Finland
Songs written by Michael Palin
1980 songs